After All This Time is the thirty-fifth studio album by American country music artist Charley Pride. It was released in March 1987 via 16th Avenue Records. The album includes the singles "Have I Got Some Blues for You" and "If You Still Want a Fool Around".

Track listing

Chart performance

References

1987 albums
Charley Pride albums
16th Avenue Records albums